Cofio River is a tributary of Alberche River, Spain. Featuring a total length of 51 km, it drains a basin area of 638.2 km2.

References 
Informational notes

Citations

Rivers of Spain
Rivers of Castile and León
Rivers of the Community of Madrid
Tagus basin
Tributaries of the Alberche